Maryam Touzani (born 17 September 1980) is a Moroccan filmmaker and actress. She is best known as the director of the critically acclaimed film Adam (2019), Morocco's entry for the 92nd Academy Awards for Best International Feature Film, and The Blue Caftan (2022), the country's submission for the same award for the 95th Academy Awards.

Early life
Touzani was born in 1980 in Tangier. In 2003, she obtained a master's degree in media communication and journalism in London. She began her career as a journalist with a focus on cinema.

Career
At first, Touzani worked as a screenwriter while directing short and documentary films. In 2011, she made the short Quand ils dorment. It won 17 prizes, including that of the Special Jury at the Huesca International Film Festival, the festival qualifying for the Oscars. In 2014, she made her debut documentary Sous Ma Peau Vieille. The film became very popular in Morocco, which discussed prostitution in Morocco. With the success of this documentary, she turned it into a feature film with the title Much Loved, which was released in 2015. The film was directed by her husband Nabil Ayouch, while she wrote the script. 

In late 2015, Touzani made her second short Aya va à la plage. The film revolves around the exploitation of small children as domestic workers.

In 2017, Touzani wrote the film Razzia with her husband. She also played the lead role of Salima in the film. Then, in 2019, Touzani directed her maiden feature film, Adam. The film was selected for the Cannes Film Festival in the section 'Un Certain Regard'. Then later at the 12th Festival International du Film Francophone de Namur of Angoulême. It was selected as the Moroccan entry for the Best International Feature Film at the 92nd Academy Awards, but it was not nominated.

In the same year, Touzani became a member of the Academy of Oscars.

In 2022, Touzani's film The Blue Caftan was awarded the Un Certain Regard FIPRESCI Prize at the 2022 Cannes Film Festival.

Personal life
Touzani is married to fellow Franco-Moroccan filmmaker Nabil Ayouch.

Filmography

References

External links
 

Living people
Moroccan film actresses
Moroccan television actresses
Moroccan women journalists
1968 births
Moroccan television personalities